John Rhea "Yank" Lawson (May 3, 1911 – February 18, 1995) was an American jazz trumpeter known for Dixieland and swing music.

Born John Lausen in 1911, from 1933 to 1935 he worked in Ben Pollack's orchestra and after that became a founding member of the Bob Crosby Orchestra. He later worked with Benny Goodman and Tommy Dorsey, but also worked with Crosby again in 1941–42. Later in the 1940s he became a studio musician leading his own Dixieland sessions.

In the 1950s he and Bob Haggart created the Lawson-Haggart band and they worked together in 1968 to form the World's Greatest Jazz Band, a Dixieland group which performed for the next ten years.

References

External links
 Yank Lawson recordings at the Discography of American Historical Recordings.
 Yank Lawson and Bob Haggart: Profiles in Jazz  by Scott Yanow

1911 births
1995 deaths
American jazz trumpeters
American male trumpeters
Dixieland trumpeters
People from Trenton, Missouri
Jazz musicians from Missouri
Swing trumpeters
20th-century American musicians
20th-century trumpeters
20th-century American male musicians
American male jazz musicians
The Tonight Show Band members
World's Greatest Jazz Band members